Norwegian County Road 5390 is a county road in the municipality of Voss in Vestland county, Norway.

The road branches off from European Route E16 in Skulestad near the village of Borstrondi, passes through Kvitheim, and continues  to the northwest along the eastern shore of Lønavatnet (Lake Løno) before rejoining European Route E16 at Tvinno. Midway along this route, there is a  spur at Nedkvitno that runs south to Nordheim (also known as Norheim), creating a connection with County Road 5388.

The section of the road south of Nedkvitno is also named Nedkvitnesvegen ('Nedkvitno Headland Road'), and the section to the north and the spur are named Reppavegen ('Reppen Road') after the village of Reppen.

The road was re-numbered in 2019 because Hordaland and Sogn og Fjordane counties were scheduled to merge and there were county roads in both counties with the same number. This road previously was County Road 309.

References

External links
Statens vegvesen – trafikkmeldinger Fv309 (Traffic Information: County Road 309)

5390
Voss